William Laing Heermance (February 28, 1837 - February 25, 1903) was a Union Army soldier in the American Civil War who received the U.S. military's highest decoration, the Medal of Honor.

Heermance was born on February 28, 1837, and entered service at Kinderhook, New York. He was awarded the Medal of Honor for extraordinary heroism on April 30, 1863, while serving as a Captain with Company C, 6th New York Cavalry Regiment, at Chancellorsville, Virginia. His Medal of Honor was issued on March 30, 1898.

He died at the age of 65, on February 25, 1903, and was buried at the Oakland Cemetery in Yonkers, New York.

Medal of Honor citation

References

External links

1837 births
1903 deaths
People from Kinderhook, New York
People of New York (state) in the American Civil War
Union Army officers
United States Army Medal of Honor recipients
American Civil War recipients of the Medal of Honor